Vivien C. Bishop (born 1945) is a New Zealand artist. Her works are held in the collections of the Auckland Art Gallery Toi o Tāmaki and Museum of New Zealand Te Papa Tongarewa

Background 
Vivien Bishop was born in 1945 in Christchurch, New Zealand.

Career 
Bishop has exhibited with:
 the New Zealand Academy of Fine Arts
 The Group in 1967, 1975, 1976, and 1977.
Works by Bishop are held in the collections of the Auckland Art Gallery Toi o Tāmaki and Museum of New Zealand Te Papa Tongarewa. Notable works include: Serendipity (1968); and Window 2 (1970).

References

Further reading 
Artist files for Vivien Bishop are held at:
 E. H. McCormick Research Library, Auckland Art Gallery Toi o Tāmaki
 Robert and Barbara Stewart Library and Archives, Christchurch Art Gallery Te Puna o Waiwhetu
 Fine Arts Library, University of Auckland
 Hocken Collections Uare Taoka o Hākena
 Te Aka Matua Research Library, Museum of New Zealand Te Papa Tongarewa
Also see:
 Concise Dictionary of New Zealand Artists McGahey, Kate (2000) Gilt Edge

New Zealand painters
Artists from Christchurch
New Zealand women artists
People associated with the Museum of New Zealand Te Papa Tongarewa
1945 births
Living people
People associated with The Group (New Zealand art)